Tokugawa Ienari (November 18, 1773 – March 22, 1841) was the eleventh and longest-serving shōgun of the Tokugawa shogunate of Japan who held office from 1787 to 1837. He was a great-grandson of the eighth shōgun Tokugawa Yoshimune through his son Munetada (1721–1764), head of the Hitotsubashi branch of the family, and his grandson Harusada (1751–1827).

Ienari died in 1841 and was given the Buddhist name Bunkyouin and buried at Kan'ei-ji.

Events of Ienari's bakufu
 1787 (Tenmei 7): Ienari becomes the 11th shōgun of the bakufu government.
 1788 (Tenmei 7): Riots in rice shops in Edo and Osaka.
 March 6 – 11, 1788 (Tenmei 8, 29th day of the 1st month – 4th day of the second month): Great Fire of Kyoto.  A fire in the city, which begins at 3 o'clock in the morning of March 6 burns uncontrolled until the 1st day of the second month (March 8); and embers smolder until extinguished by heavy rain on the 4th day of the second month (March 11).  The emperor and his court flee the fire, and the Imperial Palace is destroyed. No other re-construction is permitted until a new palace is completed. This fire was considered a major event. The Dutch VOC Opperhoofd in Dejima noted in his official record book that "people are considering it to be a great and extraordinary heavenly portent."
 February 28, 1793 (Kansei 5, on the 18th day of the 1st month): Collapse of the peak of Mount Unzen.
 March 17, 1793 (Kansei 5, on the 6th day of the 2nd month):  Eruption of Mt. Biwas-no-kubi
 April 15, 1793 (Kansei 5, on the 1st day of the 3rd month):  The Shimabara earthquake.
 May 10, 1793 (Kansei 5, on the 1st day of the 4th month):  Eruption of Mt. Miyama.
 September 1817, the Shōgun orders the expulsion of Titia Bergsma, the first European woman to visit Japan
 1833–1837, the Tenpō famine
 1837 (Tenpō 7): Tokugawa Ieyoshi becomes the 12th shōgun of the bakufu government.

Ienari's time in office was marked by an era of pleasure, excess, and corruption, which ended in the disastrous Tenpō Famine of 1832–1837, in which thousands are known to have perished.

Family life

First wife

In 1778, the four-year-old Hitotsubashi Toyochiyo (豊千代), a minor figure in the Tokugawa clan hierarchy, was betrothed to Shimazu Shigehime or Tadakohime, the four-year-old daughter of Shimazu Shigehide, the tozama daimyō of Satsuma Domain on the island of Kyūshū.  The significance of this alliance was dramatically enhanced when, in 1781, the young Toyochiyo was adopted by the childless shōgun, Tokugawa Ieharu.  This meant that when Toyochiyo became Shōgun Ienari in 1786, Shigehide was set to become the father-in-law of the shōgun.   The marriage was completed in 1789, after which Tadako became formally known as Midaidokoro Sadako, or "first wife" Sadako.  Protocol required that she be adopted into a court family, and the Konoe family agreed to take her in but this was a mere formality.

Other relationships
Ienari kept a harem of 900 women and fathered over 75 children. 

Many of Ienari's children were adopted into various daimyō houses throughout Japan, and some played important roles in the history of the Bakumatsu and Boshin War. Some of the more famous among them included:
 Hachisuka Narihiro, Tokushima Domain
 Hachisuka Mochiaki
 Hachisuka Masaaki (1871–1932)
 Hachisuka Masauji (1903–1953)
 Hachisuka Masako (1941)
 Hachisuka Toshiko (1896–1970)
 Matsudaira Naritami, Tsuyama Domain
 Tokugawa Narikatsu (1820–1849), Shimizu Tokugawa family then to Wakayama Domain
 Matsudaira Narisawa, Fukui Domain
 Tokugawa Nariyuki (1801–1846), Wakayama Domain
 Tokugawa Iemochi
 Tazawa Hidenari, Tazawa Domain, as Tazawa Hideyasu's adopted son

Parents and siblings
 Father: Tokugawa Harusada (1751–1827)
 Mother: O-Tomi no Kata (d. 1817)
 Adoptive Father: Tokugawa Ieharu
 Siblings:
 Kiihime married Hosokawa Naritatsu of Kumamoto Domain
 Matsudaira Yoshisue (1785–1804) of Takasu Domain
 Kuroda Naritaka (1777–1795) of Fukuoka Domain
 Tokugawa Harukuni (1776–1793)
 Tokugawa Nariatsu
 Hisanosuke
 Honnosuke
 Tokugawa Narimasa
 Yunosuke

Wife and concubines
 Wife: Shimazu Shigehime, later Kodaiin (1773–1844), daughter of Shimazu Shigehide of Satsuma Domain
 Concubine:
 Omiyo no Kata (1797–1872) (There is legend said that Omiyo was daughter of Tokugawa Ieharu with a servant) later Senkoin
 O-ito no kata
 Oyae no Kata (d. 1843) later Kaishun'in
 Oraku no Kata (d. 1810) later Korin'in
 Otase no Kata (d. 1832) later Myosoin
 Ohana no Kata (d. 1845) later Seiren'in
 Ohachi no Kata later Honrin'in (d. 1850)
 Ohachi no Kata (d. 1813) later Chisoin
 Osode no Kata (d. 1830) later Honshoin
 Oyachi no Kata (d. 1810) later Seishoin
 Osato no Kata (d. 1800) later Chosoin
 Ocho no Kata (d. 1852) later Sokuseiin
 Oshiga no Kata (d. 1813) later Keimeiin
 Outa no Kata (d. 1851) later Hoschiin
 Oume no Kata (d. 1794)later Shinsei-in
 Oman no Kata (d. 1835) later Seishin'in
 Obi no Kata (d. 1808) later Hoshin'in

Children
 Toshihime (1789–1817) married Tokugawa Naritomo by Oman
 Koso-in (b. 1790) by Oman
 Takechiyo (1792–1793) by Oman
 Tokugawa Ieyoshi (1793-1837) by Korin'in
 Hidehime (b. 1794) later Tansei-in by Oume
 Ayahime (1795–1797; infant when died and replaced by her younger sister, Asahime) Married Date Chikamune of Sendai Domain by Oman
 Tokugawa Keinosuke (1795–1797) by Outa
 Tokugawa Atsunosuke (1796–1799) born by Shigehime inherited Shimazu-Tokugawa family
 Sohime (1796–1797) by Oshiga
 Tokugawa Toyasaburo (b. 1798) by Outa
 Kakuhime (1798–1799) by Osato
 Gohyakuhime (1799–1800) by Outa
 Tazawa Hidenari
 Tokugawa Hidemaru
 Mine-hime (1800–1853) born by Otase and married Tokugawa Narinobu of Owari Domain 
 Tokugawa Nariyuki (1801–1846) inherited Shimizu-Tokugawa family later inherited Kii Domain and born to Otase
 Toruhime (1801–1802) by Ocho
 Jiyohime (1802–1803) by Oume
 Asahime (1803–1843) married Date Chikamune later married Matsudaira Naritsugu of Fukui Domain by Obi
 Jukihime (1803–1804) by Otase
 Tokugawa Tokinosuke (1803–1805) by Ocho
 Harehime (1805–1807) by Otase
 Tokugawa Torachiyo (1806–1810) by Ocho
 Kohime (b. 1806)
 Kishihime (1807–1811)
 Motohime (1808–1821) married Matsudaira Katahiro of Aizu Domain by Oyachi
 Ayahime (1809–1837) married Matsudaira Yoritane of Takamatsu Domain by Osode
 Tokugawa Tomomatsu (1809–1813) by Ocho
 Yohime (1813–1868), married Maeda Nariyasu, born to Omiyo
 Nakahime (1815–1817), born to Omiyo
 Tokugawa Narinori (1810–1827) inherited Shimizu family of Gosankyō and born by Oyae
 Tokugawa Naritaka born by Ocho
 Tsuyahime (b.1811) by Osode
 Morihime (1811–1846) married Nabeshima Naomasa of Saga Domain by Oyae
 Ikeda Narihiro (1812–1826) born by Oyae
 Kazuhime (1813–1830) married Mori Narito of Chōshū Domain by Ocho
 Takahime (1813–1814) by Osode
 Tokugawa Okugoro (1813–1814) by Ohachi
 Kotohime (1815–1816) by Ohana
 Tokugawa Kyugoro (1815–1817) by Ocho
 Matsudaira Naritami born to Oyae
 Suehime (1817–1872) married Asano Naritaka of Hiroshima Domain later Yousein by Omiyo
 Kiyohime (1818–1868), married Sakai Tadanori of Himeji Domain later Seiko-in, born to Oyae
 Matsudaira Nariyoshi (1820–1838) adopted to Fukui-Matsudaira family by Ohana
 Tokugawa Shichiro (1818–1821) by Osode
 Matsudaira Nariyoshi (1819–1839) of Hamada Domain and born to Oyae
 Ei-hime (1819–1875) married Tokugawa Narikura of Hitotsubashi-Tokugawa Family by Ohana
 Tokugawa Nariharu born by Ohana
 Matsudaira Narisawa born by Honrin'in
 Tokugawa Narikatsu (1820–1850) inherited Shimizu-Tokugawa family later inherited Kii Domain and born by Osode
 Hachisuka Narihiro born by Oyae
 Tokugawa Hachiro (1822–1823) by Osode
 Matsudaira Narisada (1823–1841) born by Ohana
 Matsudaira Narikoto (1825–1844) of Akashi Domain born by Ohana
 Taehime (1827–1843) by Ohana and married Ikeda Narimichi of Tottori Domain
 Tokugawa Taminosuke, born by O-ito
 Fumihime

Notable descendants
Tokugawa Nariyuki (1801–1846)
 Kikuhime
 Yohime
 Tokugawa Iemochi

Asahime (1803–1843) married Matsudaira Naritsugu
 Kikuhime (1829–1829)
 Yoshimaru (1835–1835)
 Kuninosuke

Tokugawa Naritaka
 Shomaru (1846–1847) inherited Hitotsubashi-Tokugawa family
 Rihime married Asano Yoshiteru
 Fuhime married Matsudaira Noritoshi

Yo-hime (1813–1868) married Maeda Nariyasu
 Ikeda Yoshitaka (1834–1850)
 Kanoshimaru
 Maeda Yoshiyasu
 Maeda Toshitsugu (1858–1900)
 Namiko married Toshinari Maeda
 Maeda Toshitatsu (1908–1989)
 Maeda Toshiyasu (b. 1935)
 Maeda Toshinori (b. 1963)

Matsudaira Naritami
 Matsudaira Yasutomo
 Hitoshimaru
 daughter married Miura Yoshitsugu
 Matsudaira Yasutami (1861–1921)
 Matsudaira Yasuyoshi
 Matsudaira Yasuharu
 Takako married Ichishima Noriatsu
 Teruko married Shuta Yasuto
 Watanabe Akira
 Tsuruko married Matsudaira Yoritsune
 Sansuko married Isahaya Fujio
 Matsudaira Shiro
 Matsudaira Fumihiro

Suehime
 Yakuhime (1843–1843)

Kiyo-hime
 Tokudairo (1835–1837)
 Kisohime (b. 1834) married Sakai Tadatomi

Tokugawa Narikatsu (1820–1850)
 Ryuchiyo
 Tatsujiro
 Nobehime
 Akihime
 Junhime
 Kikuhime

Hachisuka Narihiro
 Kayohime (1848–1865) married Matsudaira Mochiaki 
 Hachisuka Mochiaki
 Hachisuka Masaaki (1871–1932)
 Hachisuka Tsuruko
 Hachisuka Yoshiko
 Hachisuka Saeko married Satake Yoshitane
 Hachisuka Fueko married Masayuki Matsuda
 Asako married Prince Kaya-no-Miya Harunori
 Hachisuka Toshiko (1896–1970) married Matsudaira Yasuharu
 1 son and 4 daughters
 Masauji Hachisuka (1903–1953)
 Masako Hachisuka (b. 1941)

Tokugawa Ieyoshi
 Takechiyo (1813–1814)
 Tatsuhime (1814–1818)
 Tomohime (1815–1815)
 Saigen-in (1816–1816)
 Yochiyo (1819–1820)
 Entsuin (1822-1822)
 Tokugawa Iesada
 Maihime (1824–1829)
 Tokugawa Yoshimasa (1825–1838) of Hitotsubashi-Tokugawa Family
 Teruhime (1826–1840) married Tokugawa Yoshiyori and later known as Teimei-in
 Hanhime (1826–1826) by Okaju
 Tokugawa Harunojo (1826–1827)
 Tokugawa Atsugoro (1828–1829)
 Tokugawa Jikimaru (1829–1830)
 Tokugawa Ginnojo (1832–1833)
 Satohime (1833–1834)
 Chiehime (1835–1836)
 Yoshihime (1836–1837)
 Tokugawa Kamegoro (1838–1839)
 Maijihime (1839–1840)
 Wakahime (1842–1843)
 Shoyo-in (1843–1843)
 Okuhime (1844–1845)
 Tokugawa Tadashimaru (1845–1846)
 Shikihime (1848–1848)
 Sashin-in (1849–1849)
 Tokugawa Choyoshiro (1852–1853)

Eras of Ienari's bakufu
The years in which Ienari was shōgun are more specifically identified by more than one era name or nengō.
 Tenmei (1781–1789)
 Kansei (1789–1801)
 Kyōwa  (1801–1804)
 Bunka  (1804–1818)
 Bunsei (1818–1830)
 Tenpō  (1830–1844)

Ancestry

See also
 Matsudaira Sadanobu

Notes

References
 Hall, John Whitney and Marius Jansen. (1991).  Early Modern Japan: The Cambridge History of Japan. Cambridge: Cambridge University Press. ; OCLC 62064695
 Screech, Timon. (2006). Secret Memoirs of the Shoguns:  Isaac Titsingh and Japan, 1779–1822. London: RoutledgeCurzon.  
 Titsingh, Isaac. (1834). Nihon Ōdai Ichiran; ou,  Annales des empereurs du Japon.  Paris: Royal Asiatic Society, Oriental Translation Fund of Great Britain and Ireland. OCLC 5850691.
 Totman, Conrad. (1967). Politics in the Tokugawa bakufu, 1600–1843. Cambridge: Harvard University Press.

External links 
 PBS timeline of Japanese History

1773 births
1841 deaths
18th-century shōguns
19th-century shōguns
Tokugawa shōguns
Tokugawa clan
Child monarchs from Asia